Aboetheta is a monotypic moth genus of the Spilomelinae subfamily of the Crambidae described by Alfred Jefferis Turner in 1914. The sole species in the genus, Aboetheta pteridonoma, was described by the same author in the same year, and is found in Australia.

References

Spilomelinae
Taxa named by Alfred Jefferis Turner
Monotypic moth genera
Moths of Australia
Crambidae genera